Smith Lake is a lake in Murray County, in the U.S. state of Minnesota.

Smith Lake was named for Henry Watson Smith, an early settler.

See also
List of lakes in Minnesota

References

Lakes of Minnesota
Lakes of Murray County, Minnesota